Genrobotics is an Indian robotics company that specializes in the design and development of robotic-powered exoskeletons and human-controlled robotic systems.

History 
Genrobotics was founded in 2017 by a group of engineering graduates and is headquartered in Trivandrum, Kerala, India. In 2018, Genrobotics released the Bandicoot robot for cleaning sewers that had previously required manual scavenging which aims to eradicate manual scavenging from the world. Bandicoot Robot can do every action that a sanitation worker performs inside the manhole. The robot is the developed under the ‘Make in India’, 'Athma Nirban Bharat'  and initiatives by an Indian startup Genrobotics.

Bandicoot 2.0 was inaugurated in Delhi on October 2, 2018 by Prime Minister Narendra Modi.

Achievements 

 The Hindu BL Young Change Maker Award 2020 from Shri. Venkaiah Naidu, Hon'ble Vice President of India
 Infosys Aarohan Social Innovation Award 2019 from Mrs Sudha Murthy, Chairperson, Infosys Foundation and Mr Nandan Nilekani, Non-Executive Chairman, Infosys.
 AMRUT Tech Challenge Award by the Ministry of Housing and Urban Affairs, Government of India on ‘Promising Innovative Solution for cleaning and maintenance of sewerage systems which eliminates need for human entry.
 9th Anjani Mashelkar Inclusive Innovation Award from Mashelkar Foundation.
 Asia Inspiration Award 2018 from Mr Ahmed Mahloof, Hon'ble Minister of Youth, Sports & Community Empowerment, Government of Maldives at South Asian Youth Summit in Sri Lanka.
 Social Enterprise award of ET Startup Awards 2021: was given to Genrobotic Innovations

References

External links 
  
 Genrobotics Medical & Mobility

Robotics companies
Technology companies of India
Companies based in Thiruvananthapuram
Indian companies established in 2015
Technology companies established in 2015
2015 establishments in Kerala